The women's triple jump event at the 2000 World Junior Championships in Athletics was held in Santiago, Chile, at Estadio Nacional Julio Martínez Prádanos on 20 and 21 October.

Medalists

Results

Final
21 October

Qualifications
20 October

Group A

Group B

Participation
According to an unofficial count, 31 athletes from 24 countries participated in the event.

References

Triple jump
Triple jump at the World Athletics U20 Championships